Bring the Lions Out, released on 1 July 2008, is the second album by indie pop band melpo mene. Produced by Imperial Recordings, two singles were released, "Snakes and Lions" and "I Adore You", the latter of which was used in a 2008 Volvo commercial.

Track listing
 "Hit the Boy" - 4:02
 "Society" - 2:47
 "Babes and Darlings" - 4:07
 "I Adore You" - 4:07
 "The Sun" - 3:18
 "Eager To Find It" - 2:56
 "Kling Klang Klock" - 4:24
 "Snakes and Lions" - 3:25
 "We Were Kids" - 4:12
 "Jedi" - 4:22
 "Under the Moon" - 4:38
 "Dead On Arrival" - 3:42

References

2008 albums
Melpo Mene albums